Qaleh Kharabeh (also Romanized as Qal‘eh Kharābeh; also known as Deh Kharābeh) is a village in Hamaijan Rural District, Hamaijan District, Sepidan County, Fars Province, Iran. At the 2006 census, its population was 245, in 54 families.

References 

Populated places in Sepidan County